Plutodes is a genus of moths in the family Geometridae erected by Achille Guenée in 1857.

Description
It is similar to species of genus Lomographa. Differs from hairy palpi. Antennae uniseriate in both sexes to two-thirds of length.

Species
Plutodes argentilauta Prout, 1929 Buru, Sulawesi, Borneo, Sumatra
Plutodes costatus Butler, 1886 India, Sikkim, Nepal, China
Plutodes cyclaria Guenée, 1857 Borneo, Sumatra, Peninsular Malaysia
Plutodes discigera Butler, 1880 northern India - south-eastern China
Plutodes evaginata Holloway, 1993 Borneo
Plutodes exiguifascia Hampson, 1895 Sri Lanka
Plutodes flavescens Butler, 1880 north-eastern Himalayas, Borneo, Sumatra, Java
Plutodes malaysiana Holloway, 1982 Peninsular Malaysia, Singapore, Borneo
Plutodes nilgirica Hampson, 1891 southern India
Plutodes signifera Warren, 1896 Australia
Plutodes transmutata Walker, 1861 India, Nepal, probably in Sri Lanka
Plutodes unidentata Holloway, 1976 Borneo, Sumatra, Java, Sulawesi
Plutodes wandamannensis Joicey & Talbot, 1917 New Guinea

References

Plutodini